Hugh Weedon Mercer (November 27, 1808 – June 9, 1877) was an officer in the United States Army and then a Confederate general during the American Civil War.

Early life

Hugh W. Mercer, the son of Hugh Tenant Weedon Mercer and his wife Louisa Griffin (daughter of Cyrus Griffin), was born in Fredericksburg, Virginia, to a wealthy and well-known family. His grandfather and namesake Hugh Mercer of Scotland had been a general under George Washington during the American Revolution. Mercer attended West Point in 1824. He was expelled for participating in the Eggnog Riot in 1826. But following a pardon by President John Quincy Adams, Mercer was permitted to graduate in 1828 (3rd out of 33).

Mercer was commissioned as a second lieutenant in the US Artillery. He spent much of his time serving in Georgia and was an aide to Major General Winfield Scott. Mercer was promoted to first lieutenant of artillery in October 1834.

In April 1835, he resigned his commission and settled in Savannah where he married a local woman, Mary Stites Anderson, the daughter of the President of The Planters Bank; his brother-in-law was George Wayne Anderson. While Mercer worked as a bank cashier at The Planters Bank, he served as an artillery officer in the Georgia Militia. He started building the Italianate-style Mercer House on the western side of Monterey Square in Savannah. However, the Civil War interrupted its construction and no Mercer ever lived there.

Civil War
In May 27th 1861, he enlisted in the Confederate army, and was commissioned as the colonel of the 1st Georgia Infantry. He was promoted to brigadier general by the end of October. He served as commander of the District of Georgia. In August 1862, he played a major role in impressing the first group of slaves and free blacks into service for the Confederacy. By November, however, he lost his authority to impress workers, and depended on Governor Joseph E. Brown and local sheriffs to provide slaves to join the Confederate effort. At the beginning of the Atlanta Campaign, he left Savannah and took command of a brigade in the Army of Tennessee.

Mercer fought at Dalton, Marietta and Kennesaw Mountain (where his son was wounded). Following the Battle of Atlanta in 1864, he became ill and was relieved of command. He was sent home to Savannah, where he served under Lieutenant General William J. Hardee. Mercer was considered to be a good officer, but was unable to endure the physical demands of active duty.

Mercer commanded the 10th Battalion, Georgia Infantry, which was charged with the defense of the Savannah area. When Hardee retreated in December 1864, Mercer left the city, returning after the fighting ended. He was briefly imprisoned on at Fort Pulaski, which he had once commanded, on Cockspur Island after the end of the war, along with other prominent Confederate leaders.

Later life
After the war, Mercer returned to Savannah and resumed his work in banking. In 1869, he moved to Baltimore, where he worked as a commission merchant. However, with failing health, Mercer traveled to the spa resort in Baden-Baden, Germany for treatment in 1872.

He died there in 1877. Mercer's body was returned to Savannah. He was buried in Bonaventure Cemetery, owned by City of Savannah, located in Thunderbolt, Georgia.

His great-grandson Johnny Mercer (1909 – 1976) was a lyricist and composer who co-founded Capitol Records.

His great x5 - grandson Sergeant Christopher Mercer Lowe (US Army) served in the same Georgia National Guard unit (HHB 1/118th FA Chatham Artillery, 48th IBCT) almost 150 years after him and his son, Lt Geo A Mercer.

See also

List of American Civil War generals (Confederate)

References

Further reading
 Eicher, John H., and David J. Eicher, Civil War High Commands. Stanford: Stanford University Press, 2001. .
 Sifakis, Stewart. Who Was Who in the Civil War. New York: Facts On File, 1988. .
 
 Warner, Ezra J. Generals in Gray: Lives of the Confederate Commanders. Baton Rouge: Louisiana State University Press, 1959.

External links 

Stuart A. Rose Manuscript, Archives, and Rare Book Library, Emory University: Hugh Weedon Mercer letters, 1861-1866

1808 births
1877 deaths
United States Military Academy alumni
United States Army officers
Confederate States Army brigadier generals
Military personnel from Fredericksburg, Virginia
People of Georgia (U.S. state) in the American Civil War
Businesspeople from Georgia (U.S. state)
American people of Scottish descent
19th-century American businesspeople